Fires are common in buildings under construction and renovation, and present particular difficulties to firefighters.

During construction, buildings often do not have elements that would protect them from fire, such as walls and sprinkler systems. Poor water supplies and the accumulation of flammable materials also present risks. Works often require heat or even open flame, and these can set off fires that smoulder for hours before being noticed. For this reason, work sites may need 24-hour fire watches.

Builder's risk insurance may cover damage from such fires.

See also
List of building or structure fires

References

External links

fires
Types of fire
Building and structure fires